Misgiving is an American Melodic metalcore band from Richmond, Virginia, United States. The band formed in early 2017 and self-released their debut EP titled "Beg for Forgiveness" on July 23, 2017. The band released a single titled "Absolution" alongside announcing the release of their EP "Resolve" which was released on February 22, 2019.

History

Formation and "Beg for Forgiveness" (2017–2018)
Misgiving was formed in 2017 by Tyler Morris and Joseph Sauret. They immediately began working on their first EP "Beg for Forgiveness". The four track EP was self produced. The EP was released on July 13, 2017 and was met with positive reviews. During 2017 Misgiving picked up member Aaron Wilson as a second guitarist.

After the release of "Beg for Forgiveness," Misgiving immediately started working on new material for a second EP. During the writing processes the band picked up new member Cass Clary as a bassist. The remainder of 2017 was spent writing the new EP. The band stated to have written over 30 songs for the upcoming release but only 5 made the cut.

Line up changes and "Resolve" (2018–present)
The band spent the latter half of 2018 recording their upcoming EP. While in the recording process, bassist Cass Clary left and Chris Waite joined as their drummer.

While still recording, the band set out to record a video for what would be the first and only single off of "Resolve." Misgiving released a teaser for a music video premiere.

"Absolution" was released on January 3, 2019. Alongside the music video and the EP title announcement and release date of February 22, 2019. 

"Resolve" was released on February 22, 2019 on several major streaming platforms. The EP was recorded, produced, mixed and mastered by Jeremy Anderson of the Virginia metalcore band, RVNT. The EP was met with positive reviews. Shortly after the release of "Resolve," Aaron Wilson left the band due to unknown reasons. The band has never made a public announcement about the departure.

Members
Current
 Tyler Morris  – vocals (2017–2022)
 Joseph Sauret – guitars (2017–2022)
 Chris Waite – drums (2018–2022)

Former
 Aaron Wilson – guitars (2017–2019)
 Cass Clary – bass (2018–2018)

Musical style
Misgiving incorporates elements of melodic metalcore, post-hardcore, ambient and djent in their music. They often feature calm atmospheric passages and intense metalcore breakdowns. The band delivers vocals in a wide range, including high pitch, mid-pitch screams and clean singing. The band has been compared to The Amity Affliction, Saosin, I See Stars, Underoath, Invent Animate and Oceans Ate Alaska.

Discography

EPs

Singles
 "Coming Home" (2017)
 "Absolution" (2019)
 "Sirena" (2019)
 "Avoidance" (2020)
 "2010 Called, They Want Their Song Back" (2022)

References

Metalcore musical groups from Virginia
American post-hardcore musical groups